Bagnell Ferry is an unincorporated community in Curry County, Oregon, United States.

The community is named after William Bagnell, who operated a river ferry at this location. A post office named Bagnell opened here in 1894 but closed less than a year later. John R. Miller was its first and only postmaster.

References

Oregon Coast
Unincorporated communities in Curry County, Oregon
Unincorporated communities in Oregon
Populated coastal places in Oregon